Cavell is an unincorporated community in Woodruff County, Arkansas, United States.  It is west of McCrory, Arkansas and just west of Patterson, Arkansas, though there is no direct road between Cavell and Patterson. It is located off Woodruff County Road 775 at the Old Highway 64 4WD Trail.

References

Unincorporated communities in Woodruff County, Arkansas
Unincorporated communities in Arkansas